The Adirondack Thunder are a professional ice hockey team in the ECHL that began play in the 2015–16 season. The team is based in Glens Falls, New York, and affiliated with the NHL's New Jersey Devils. The Thunder play their home games at the Cool Insuring Arena.

The Thunder replaced the AHL's Adirondack Flames after they were relocated to Stockton, California, to become the Stockton Heat.

History
On January 29, 2015, the Calgary Flames announced that they would be moving their AHL affiliate, the Adirondack Flames, to Stockton as one of five charter members of the AHL's new Pacific Division.  The next day, the Flames announced that the ECHL's Stockton Thunder (who they had purchased the day before) would move to Glens Falls in what was essentially a "market swap".

The Thunder name, logo and colors were unveiled on February 11, 2015. Cail MacLean was announced the team's first head coach on July 23, 2015.

The Thunder made the playoffs during their first season and were the first Adirondack hockey team to make the playoffs in ten years. They defeated the favored Manchester Monarchs four-games-to-one in the first round, becoming the first team in Glens Falls to win a playoff series since the Adirondack Red Wings in 1994. They faced the South Carolina Stingrays in the second round, which they lost in seven games.

During their second season, the league announced the sale of the Thunder from Calgary Sports and Entertainment to a local ownership group called Adirondack Civic Center Coalition on February 28, 2017. The Thunder were the third of the three displaced franchises from the 2015 creation of the AHL Pacific Division to be sold by their NHL owners after relocating. However, in order for the new ownership group to complete the purchase of the team, they needed to raise $500,000 by a June 30, 2017, deadline and have since been asking for donations and hosting fundraisers. The new ownership group completed the purchase on time but were in debt. They were able to sell the naming rights of the Glens Falls Civic Center to become the Cool Insuring Arena to cover some of the operating costs.

With the Flames no longer operating the team, the Flames and Thunder ended their affiliation following the 2016–17 season. Head coach MacLean would also leave to join the Flames' AHL affiliate in Stockton as an assistant coach. The Thunder would then officially become the ECHL affiliate of the New Jersey Devils for the 2017–18 season, and later extended the affiliation agreement for the 2018–19 season. For the Thunder's first two seasons, the Devils' organization had been sending players to Glens Falls due to the proximity of their previous AHL affiliate, the Albany Devils. The Thunder also hired Brad Tapper as its next head coach.

Under Tapper, the Thunder finished the 2017–18 season first in their division and advanced to the conference finals before losing to the Florida Everblades four games to one. The Devils and the Thunder renewed their affiliation for another season. Tapper was then hired by the Grand Rapids Griffins of the AHL as an assistant coach and was replaced by Alex Loh as head coach for the 2018–19 ECHL season.

Due to the COVID-19 pandemic, the Thunder voluntarily suspended operations for the 2020–21 ECHL season.

On May 11, 2022, the Thunder would announce that the organization would be parting ways with Head Coach and Director of Hockey Operations Alex Loh. This coming after finishing the 2021-2022 season with a record of 27-40-4-0, a league worst .408 winning percentage and missing the playoffs for the first time since the team relocated to Glens Falls.

Subsequently after the teams parting with Alex Loh, the organization would announce on June 21, 2022, that Pete MacArthur would be named the 4th head coach in team history.

Rivals
The Manchester Monarchs were the Thunder's main rival. Following both franchises relocating from California, the two teams met for four straight seasons in the Kelly Cup playoffs. The teams each won two series, alternating years, before the Monarchs ceased operations in 2019. The Thunder also have rivalries with the Reading Royals, Maine Mariners, Worcester Railers, and Brampton Beast before the Beast ceased operations in 2021 due to the COVID-19 pandemic. But with the additions of the Newfoundland Growlers, Trois-Rivières Lions and Norfolk Admirals to the ECHL's North Division, the Thunder could have new rivalries develop in the future.

Season-by-season records

Players and personnel

Current roster
Updated December 11, 2022.

-->

Team captains
Rob Bordson, 2015
Pete MacArthur, 2016–2017, 2021–2022
Mike Bergin, 2017–2018
James Henry, 2018–2020
Shane Harper, 2022–

Head coaches
Cail MacLean, 2015–2017
Brad Tapper, 2017–2018
Alex Loh, 2018–2022
Pete MacArthur, 2022–

References

External links
Adirondack Thunder Website

ECHL teams
Calgary Flames minor league affiliates
New Jersey Devils minor league affiliates
Ice hockey teams in New York (state)
Ice hockey clubs established in 2015
2015 establishments in New York (state)
Sports in Glens Falls, New York